is a railway station in the city of Gamagōri, Aichi Prefecture, Japan, operated by Meitetsu.

Lines

Station layout
The station has two opposed unnumbered side platforms connected to the station building by a level crossing. The station is unattended.

Platforms

Adjacent stations

|-
!colspan=5|Nagoya Railroad

Station history
Katahara Station was opened on July 24, 1936. The station building burned down in 1987 and was rebuilt.

Surrounding area
Katahara onsen
Gamagohri Baseball Stadium

See also
 List of Railway Stations in Japan

External links

 Official web page

Railway stations in Japan opened in 1936
Railway stations in Aichi Prefecture
Stations of Nagoya Railroad
Gamagōri, Aichi